Simmie Hill, Jr. (November 14, 1946 – July 14, 2013) was an American professional basketball player. At 6'7", he played the forward position.

Born in Midland, Pennsylvania, Hill attended Midland High School, where he starred on the school's basketball team alongside Norm Van Lier. During his senior year, Hill scored 652 points and led the Midland Leopards to the Pennsylvania State Championship. He spent his college career at Wichita State University (where he played on the freshman team as first year students were not eligible to play varsity basketball at that time), Cameron Junior College and West Texas State University, and after his senior year was named a first team All American by The Sporting News. Hill then played four seasons in the American Basketball Association as a member of the Los Angeles Stars, Miami Floridians, Dallas Chaparrals, San Diego Conquistadors, and San Antonio Spurs. He averaged 9.7 points per game in his ABA career.

References

External links

Simmie Hill at the Beaver County Sports Hall of Fame

1946 births
2013 deaths
African-American basketball players
American men's basketball players
Basketball players from Pennsylvania
Cameron Aggies men's basketball players
Chicago Bulls draft picks
Dallas Chaparrals players
Delaware Blue Bombers players
Junior college men's basketball players in the United States
Los Angeles Stars draft picks
Los Angeles Stars players
Miami Floridians players
Parade High School All-Americans (boys' basketball)
People from Beaver County, Pennsylvania
San Antonio Spurs players
San Diego Conquistadors players
Small forwards
West Texas A&M Buffaloes basketball players
20th-century African-American sportspeople
21st-century African-American people